Asphyxia is a condition of deficient supply of oxygen to the body.

It may also refer to:

 Mount Asphyxia
 Asphyxia (film), a 2017 Iranian neo-noir film 
 "Asphyxia", a song by The Network from the 2020 album Money Money 2020 Part II: We Told Ya So!
 Asphyxia (author)